Şıxlar (also, Shikhlyar and Shykhlyar) is a village and municipality in the Sabirabad Rayon of Azerbaijan.  It has a population of 693.

References 

Populated places in Sabirabad District